Bloodbound is a Swedish power metal band formed in 2004 in Bollnäs.

History 
They released their first studio album, Nosferatu, in 2005 and their second, Book of the Dead, in May 2007. The brainchild of former Street Talk members Fredrik Bergh and Tomas Olsson, the band has also included Michael Bormann (Jaded Heart), Urban Breed (Tad Morose) and Pelle Åkerlind (Morgana Lefay). Their debut album Nosferatu featured former Tad Morose singer Urban Breed on vocals. Released on 16 December 2005 (in Japan; European release date 24 February 2006), Nosferatu features artwork by Mark Wilkinson (Iron Maiden, Judas Priest, Marillion) and received an early rave review from the Swedish rock magazine Power Play.  Based solely on the strength of their debut album, the band opened for Evergrey and headlined day one of the Gothenburg Metal Festival.

After Urban Breed announced his departure from Bloodbound in fall 2006, former Tad Morose singer Kristian Andrèn briefly joined the band for some live dates. In March 2007, they announced their new singer, German Michael Bormann, who laid down vocals on the band's second album Book of the Dead.  Bormann, however, played no live shows with Bloodbound; for their first performance after releasing Book of the Dead (June 2007 at Sweden Rock Festival), Urban Breed handled the vocal duties. Urban also performed with the band at subsequent shows, including Bollnäs Festivalen in July 2007. Bloodbound played two sets, both backed up by a symphony orchestra. For the second set, they backed Paul Di'Anno of Iron Maiden fame. In October 2007, they announced that original singer Urban Breed had officially re-joined and would sing during the band's tour in support of HammerFall. 

In 2009, the band signed a deal with the label Blistering Records for their third album release, titled Tabula Rasa. The album was set for release in April 2009. In April 2010, Breed announced on his forum that Bloodbound had decided to continue with another singer, ending his second tenure with the band. They had recruited Patrik Selleby (back then known as Patrik Johansson), from the band Dawn of Silence.

Despite the band's apparent black metal image (the band members have worn make-up in the "corpse paint" style in the promotional photos on their albums and website and during some live shows), Bloodbound's music does not fit into the black metal category. Instead, it is more similar in style to heavy metal bands such as Helloween and Iron Maiden, although the lyrics sometimes approach darker subjects. Stormborn (2014) marked a thematic shift of the band's lyrics into more medieval fantasy topics, with numerous references to the popular TV series Game of Thrones. From War of Dragons (2017), the lyrical themes have departed completely into medieval fantasy themes, with a particular emphasis on dragons and keeping up with the references to Game of Thrones, which are carried on in the following album Rise of the Dragon Empire (2019).

Members

Present 
 Patrik Selleby – lead vocals
 Tomas Olsson – lead and rhythm guitars
 Fredrik Bergh – keyboards, backing vocals
 Henrik Olsson – rhythm guitars
 Anders Broman – bass
 Daniel Sjögren – drums

Former 
 Urban Breed – lead vocals
 Oskar Belin – drums, percussion
 Jörgen "Poe" Andersson – bass
 Markus Albertson – guitars
 Kristian Andrèn – lead vocals
 Michael Bormann – lead vocals
 Johan Sohlberg – bass
 Pelle Åkerlind – drums, percussion

Timeline

Discography 
Studio albums
Nosferatu (2005)
Book of the Dead (2007)
Tabula Rasa (2009)
Unholy Cross (2011)
In the Name of Metal (2012)
Stormborn (2014)
War of Dragons (2017)
Rise of the Dragon Empire (2019)
Creatures of the Dark Realm (2021)
Tales from the North (2023)

Live albums
One Night of Blood: Live at Masters of Rock MMXV (2016)

Music videos
 "In the Name of Metal" (2012)
 "Stormborn" (2014)
 "Moria" (Live) (2016)
 "Metal Monster" (Live) (2016)
 "Battle in the Sky" (2017)
 "Rise of the Dragon Empire" (2019)
 "Creatures of the Dark Realm" (2021)

References

External links 

Unofficial fan website

Musical groups established in 2004
Swedish power metal musical groups